Krystsina Fedarashka (born 16 April 1994) is a Belarusian freestyle wrestler. She won one of the bronze medals in the 65 kg event at the 2018 European Wrestling Championships held in Kaspiysk, Russia. In her bronze medal match, she defeated Viktoria Bobeva of Bulgaria.

Major results

References

External links 
 

Living people
1994 births
Place of birth missing (living people)
Belarusian female sport wrestlers
European Wrestling Championships medalists
21st-century Belarusian women